Christian Scheuß (born 14 January 1966 in Bottrop) is a German author and journalist.

Life 
After school and a first apprenticeship as technician for consumer electronics he changed to journalism. His education as journalist started 1991 at the local radio station Radio Emscher-Lippe in Northrhine-Westphalia. Between 1995 and 2003 he was chief editor of the gay magazine Rosa Zone and the gay newspaper Queer. 2003 he founded – together with the journalist Micha Schulze the company Queer Communications GmbH in Cologne. As a non-fiction author Scheuß has written several books on LGBT and sex topics. Scheuß lives in Cologne.

Selected works 

 Erotic Bodystyling, Bruno Gmünder Verlag, 1996
 Fremdgehen macht Glücklich – Neue schwule Lebens- und Liebesformen, Schwarzkopf & Schwarzkopf Verlag, 2004
 Gay Online Dating, Bruno Gmünder Verlag, 2005
 Poppers, Himmelstürmer Verlag, 2006
 Das Schwanzbuch, Bruno Gmünder Verlag, 2006
 Alles, was Familie ist, Schwarzkopf & Schwarzkopf Verlag, 2007
 Das Arschbuch, Bruno Gmünder Verlag, 2007
 Das Orgasmusmbuch, Bruno Gmünder Verlag, 2007
 Sexparty! Mehr Spaß bei Dreier, Gangbang und Orgien, Himmelstürmer Verlag, August 2007
 Toys For Boys, Bruno Gmünder Verlag, 2009
 The Dick Book: Tuning Your Favorite Body Part, Bruno Gmünder Verlag, August 2012
 The Ass Book: Staying on Top of Your Bottom, Bruno Gmünder Verlag, Februar 2013

References

External links 
 Official website Christian Scheuß
 Bruno Gmünder Verlag:Christian Scheuß
 queer.de-Team:Christian Scheuß

German male journalists
German gay writers
German non-fiction writers
German erotica writers
German LGBT rights activists
1966 births
Living people
German LGBT journalists
20th-century German male writers
21st-century German male writers
21st-century German LGBT people